Pamb may refer to
Lernapar, Armenia, formerly Armenian Pamb
Sipan, Armenia, formerly Kurdish Pamb